Duala or Douala can refer to:

Relating to Cameroon
 Duala people, an ethnic group in Cameroon
 Duala language, part of the Bantu languages
 Douala, the largest city in Cameroon, founded by the Duala people
 Rudolf Duala Manga Bell (1873–1914), a Duala king and resistance leader
 Alexandre Douala Manga Bell (1897–1966), son of above
 Roudolphe Douala (born 1978), Cameroonian footballer

Other
 Douala, Guinea, a village in the Nzérékoré Prefecture, Guinea
 Duala language, alternative spelling for Australian Aboriginal Dhuwal language
, a Kriegsmarine accommodation ship